3671 Dionysus is a small binary Amor asteroid, orbiting between Earth and the asteroid belt. It was discovered by Carolyn and Gene Shoemaker at Palomar Observatory on 27 May 1984. It is named after Dionysus, the Greek god of wine. Its provisional designation was 1984 KD. It is an outer Earth grazer because its perihelion is just within Earth's orbit.

Potentially hazardous object 
3671 Dionysus is a potentially hazardous asteroid (PHA) because its minimum orbit intersection distance (MOID) is less than 0.05 AU and its diameter is greater than 150 meters. Its orbit is well-determined for the next several hundred years.

Dionysus makes modestly close approaches to Earth. On 19 June 1984 Dionysus passed  from Earth. On 18 June 2085 it will pass  from Earth.

Moon 
In 1997, a team of astronomers at the European Southern Observatory announced that lightcurve observations indicate the presence of a small moon orbiting Dionysus. Its provisional designation is S/1997 (3671) 1. This moon measures 300 meters in diameter, and orbits 3.6 km from Dionysus with an eccentricity of 0.07 and an orbital period of 27.72 hours. From the surface of Dionysus, S/1997 (3671) 1 would have an apparent diameter of roughly 3.02 degrees. For comparison, the Sun appears to be 0.5° from Earth.

Notes

References

External links 
 Asteroids with Satellites, Robert Johnston, johnstonsarchive.net
 
 
 

003671
Discoveries by Eugene Merle Shoemaker
Discoveries by Carolyn S. Shoemaker
Named minor planets
003671
003671
003671
19840527